Streator Station was a train station located in Streator, Illinois, United States. It was served by numerous Atchison, Topeka and Santa Fe Railway (AT&SF) passenger trains during its heyday. Amtrak (the National Railroad Passenger Corporation) served the station until 1996 with the Southwest Chief between Chicago and Los Angeles daily. When the Burlington Northern and the AT&SF railways merged, BNSF built a connecting track between the two main lines east of Cameron, Illinois, (known as the Cameron Connector).  This allowed passenger trains to change from the former Chicago, Burlington and Quincy Railroad (CB&Q) main line to the Southern Transcon freely. This along with the amendment of a stretch of track that was essential for getting to Chicago Union Station forced Amtrak to reroute the Southwest Chief to bypass Chillicothe and Streator.

In 2013, the station received upgrades by BNSF Railway including "a new roof, brickwork, tuck-pointing, and new windows."

World War II Canteen Monument

Streator Station is home to a monument that honors the volunteers who served millions of soldiers and sailors passing by on troop trains. The canteen was open from November 26, 1943 to May 29, 1946 and served an estimated 1.5 million soldiers and sailors. The troops would be fed by volunteers boarding the train while it was serviced. The statue was unveiled on November 11, 2006.

References

External links
Streator Station Picture 1
Streator Station Picture 2
Amtrak at Streator

Former Amtrak stations in Illinois
Streator, Illinois
Atchison, Topeka and Santa Fe Railway stations
Railway stations closed in 1996
Railway stations in LaSalle County, Illinois
Monuments and memorials in Illinois
Tourist attractions in LaSalle County, Illinois
1996 disestablishments in Illinois